I'll See You in My Dreams was a 10" LP album issued by Columbia Records as catalog # CL-6198 on December 14, 1951, featuring Doris Day and Paul Weston's orchestra, containing songs from the soundtrack of the movie of the same name.

The album was combined with Day's 1953 album, Calamity Jane, on a compact disc, issued on June 12, 2001 by Collectables Records.

Track listing
"Ain't We Got Fun?" (Richard A. Whiting/Raymond B. Egan/Gus Kahn) (duet with Danny Thomas)
"The One I Love (Belongs to Somebody Else)" (Isham Jones/Gus Kahn)
"I Wish I Had a Girl" (with the Norman Luboff Choir)
"It Had to Be You" (Isham Jones/Gus Kahn)
"Nobody's Sweetheart" (Elmer Schoebel/Ernie Erdman/Gus Kahn/Billy Meyers) (with the Norman Luboff Choir)
"My Buddy" (Walter Donaldson/Gus Kahn)
"Makin' Whoopee!" (Walter Donaldson/Gus Kahn) (duet with Danny Thomas)
"I'll See You in My Dreams" (Isham Jones/Gus Kahn) (with the Norman Luboff Choir)

External links
 I'll See You in My Dreams

1951 soundtrack albums
Film soundtracks
Doris Day soundtracks
Columbia Records soundtracks